John Drummond may refer to:
 Sir John Drummond 2nd of Innerpeffray (c. 1486 – c. 1565)
 John Drummond of Jamaica (1744–1804), surgeon and landowner
 John Drummond of Milnab (died c. 1550), 16th-century Scottish engineer
 John Fraser Drummond (1918–1940), WW2 fighter pilot
 John Drummond, 1st Earl of Melfort (1649–1714), Earl of Melfort
 John Drummond, 15th Baron Strange (1900–1982), of Megginch Castle, Scotland, author, farmer, politician
 John Drummond (1676–1742), of Quarrell, Member of Parliament (MP) for Perth Burghs, Scotland (1727–1743)
 John Drummond, 10th of Lennoch and 3rd of Megginch (died 1752),  MP for Perthshire, Scotland (1727–1734)
 John Drummond (1723–1774), banker and MP for Thetford (1768–1774)
 John Drummond, 12th of Lennoch and 5th of Megginch, contractor and MP for Shaftesbury (1786–1790)
 John Drummond (Australian settler) (1816–1906), settler of Western Australia
 John Douglas Fraser Drummond (1860–1925), Canadian farmer and politician
 John Drummond (footballer) (1869–?), Scottish footballer
 John Drummond (Manitoba politician) (1847–1913), politician in Manitoba, Canada
 John W. Drummond (1919–2016), American politician, member of the South Carolina Senate
 John Drummond, pseudonym used by British writer John Lymington (1911–1983)
 John Drummond (arts administrator) (1934–2006), British arts administrator and BBC executive
 John Drummond (musicologist) (born 1944), New Zealand composer and academic

Earl of Perth

 John Drummond, 1st Lord Drummond (died 1519), Scottish statesman
 John Drummond, 2nd Earl of Perth (1588–1662), Scottish nobleman
 John Drummond, 4th Duke of Perth (1713–1747), de jure 7th Earl of Perth
 John Drummond, 5th Duke of Perth (died 1757) de jure 8th Earl of Perth
 John Drummond, 2nd Duke of Melfort (1682–1754) de jure 10th Earl of Perth
 Eric Drummond, 7th Earl of Perth (1876–1951)), first secretary-general of the League of Nations (1920–1933)
 David Drummond, 8th Earl of Perth (John David Drummond, 1907–2002), de jure 17th earl

See also 
 Jock Drummond (1870–1935), Scottish footballer
 Jon Drummond (born 1968), American athlete
 Jon Drummond (composer) (born 1969), Australian composer
 Johnston Drummond (1820–1845), early settler of Western Australia